The 2014–15 Villanova Wildcats women's basketball team is representing Villanova University in the 2014–15 NCAA Division I women's basketball season. The Wildcats led by thirty-seventh year head coach Harry Perretta, they played their games at The Pavilion and were members of the Big East Conference. They finished the season 22–14, 12–6 in Big East play to finish in third place. They advanced to the semifinals of the Big East women's tournament where they lost to DePaul. They were invited to the Women's National Invitation Tournament where they defeated Maine in the first round, Old Dominion in the second round, Big East member St. John's in the third round before losing to West Virginia in the quarterfinals.

Roster

Schedule

|-
!colspan=9 style="background:#013974; color:#67CAF1;"| Exhibition

|-
!colspan=9 style="background:#013974; color:#67CAF1;"| Non-Conference Regular Season

|-
!colspan=9 style="background:#013974; color:#67CAF1;"| 2015 Big East tournament

|-
!colspan=9 style="background:#013974; color:#67CAF1;"|WNIT

References

See also 

 2014–15 Villanova Wildcats men's basketball team

Villnova
Villanova Wildcats women's basketball seasons
Villa
Villa